Meditrina Hospital is a hospital in the city of Kollam, India. It is the first tertiary care hospital in the city, located at Ayathil, and was inaugurated 13 December 2014. Meditrina Group of Hospitals is headquartered at Kollam, mainly aiming to provide bypass and allied cardiac care.

The Meditrina Group has recently raised $6 Million(INR 30 crores) from Matrix Partners India.

Branches
ESIC Heart Centre, Asramam (Kollam, Kerala)
 Panchkula (Haryana)
 Ambala Cantt. (Haryana)
 Faridabad (Haryana)
 Thiruvananthapuram (Kerala)
 Jamshedpur (Jharkhand)
Chas-Bokaro (Jharkhand)
Gurugram (Haryana)
Agroha (Haryana)
Maldives

References

Hospital buildings completed in 2014
Hospitals in Kollam
2014 establishments in Kerala